André Filipe Bessa Leal (born 24 August 1988 in Paços de Ferreira) known as André Rateira, is a Portuguese footballer who plays for C.D. Trofense as a forward.

Football career
On 29 July 2012, Rateira made his professional debut with Trofense in a 2012–13 Taça da Liga match against Aves.

References

External links

Stats and profile at LPFP 

1988 births
Living people
Portuguese footballers
Association football forwards
Liga Portugal 2 players
C.D. Trofense players
People from Paços de Ferreira
Sportspeople from Porto District